Hermann Teuber (12 August 1894 – 24 October 1985) was a German painter. His work was part of the painting event in the art competition at the 1936 Summer Olympics.

References

1894 births
1985 deaths
20th-century German painters
20th-century German male artists
German male painters
Olympic competitors in art competitions
People from Dresden